In Angel City is an album by the American jazz bassist Charlie Haden's Quartet West recorded in 1988 and released on the Verve label.

Reception 
The Allmusic review by Scott Yanow awarded the album 4 stars, stating, "An excellent showcase for Haden in a straight-ahead setting and for Watts, whose passionate sound perfectly fits the band. Highly recommended".

Track listing
All compositions by Charlie Haden except as indicated
 "Sunday at the Hillcrest" - 6:21 
 "First Song" - 6:57 
 "The Red Wind" (Pat Metheny) - 4:55 
 "Blue in Green" (Miles Davis, Bill Evans) - 7:16 
 "Alpha" (Ornette Coleman) - 6:27 
 "Live Your Dreams" (Ernie Watts) - 6:32 
 "Child's Play" - 3:06 
 "Fortune's Fame" (Vince Mendoza) - 8:09 
 "Tarantella" (Alan Broadbent) - 3:15 Bonus track on CD
 "Lonely Woman" (Coleman) - 13:41 Bonus track on CD
Recorded at Producers 1 & 2 in Los Angeles, California on May 30-June 1, 1988

Personnel
Charlie Haden – bass
Ernie Watts - tenor saxophone, shaker, synthesizer
Alan Broadbent - piano
Larance Marable - drums
Alex Cline - drums, percussion (track 3)

References 

Verve Records albums
Charlie Haden albums
1988 albums